The Niigata Daishoten (Japanese 新潟大賞典) is a Grade 3 horse race for Thoroughbreds aged four and over, run in late April or early May over a distance of 2000 metres on turf at Niigata Racecourse.

The Niigata Daishoten was first run in its current form in 1979 and has held Grade 3 status since 1984. The race was run at Fukushima Racecourse in 1985, 1990, 1995, 2000 and 2001. It was run over 2200 metres in 1984, from 1986 to 1989 and from 1991 to 1994.

Winners since 2000

Earlier winners

 1984 - Micron Tenro
 1985 - Kane Kuroshio
 1986 - Super Gura Third
 1987 - Sette Juno
 1988 - Make A Smart
 1989 - Memory Vica
 1990 - Yuwa Forte
 1991 - Tosho Balkan
 1992 - Meiro Palmer
 1993 - Hashino Kenshiro
 1994 - Golden Hour
 1995 - Irish Dance
 1996 - Maillot Jaune
 1997 - Maillot Jaune
 1998 - Silent Hunter
 1999 - Brilliant Road

See also
 Horse racing in Japan
 List of Japanese flat horse races

References

Turf races in Japan